Hell of Love is a 1926 German silent drama film directed by Bruno Rahn and starring Vivian Gibson, Erich Kaiser-Titz, and William Dieterle.

The film's sets were designed by the art director Otto Guelstorff.

Cast

References

Bibliography

External links

1926 films
Films of the Weimar Republic
German silent feature films
Films directed by Bruno Rahn
1926 drama films
German drama films
Silent drama films
1920s German films